Stelios Pozatzidis (born 24 June 1994) is a Greek professional footballer who plays as a left-back for Super League 2 club Kifisia.

Career
Pozatzidis made his league debut with PAOK against Platanias on 31 August 2014.

On 1 July 2021, he extended his contract with Ergotelis for two more years.

Personal life
Pozatzidis' cousin, Theocharis, is also a professional footballer.

Career statistics

References

1994 births
Living people
Greek footballers
PAOK FC players
Apollon Pontou FC players
Panionios F.C. players
Ergotelis F.C. players
Association football defenders
Footballers from Thessaloniki